Rajeev Ravindranathan (also known as Rajeev Ravindranath) is an Indian actor and comedian who works in Hindi and Tamil-language films. He is known for his roles in 3 Idiots (2009), English Vinglish (2012), and Rocketry: The Nambi Effect (2022).

Early life 
Rajeev Ravindranathan studied business management for his bachelor's degree at Christ University. He originally began his career at HSBC in the late 1990s and went on to work various jobs in financial planning and advertising until the early 2000s.

Career 
Ravindranathan played minor roles in Freaky Chakra (2003) and Bas Yun Hi (2003), but was first noticed in Rajkumar Hirani's 3 Idiots (2009) for his role as a senior in college who rags Aamir Khan's character. He initially auditioned for the role of Chatur (later played by Omi Vaidya) and was cast in R. Madhavan's role. After shooting for the film for two months, his scenes were reshot because Hirani wanted to cast a "known face" and he was cast in a different role. He notably played Ramamurthy, Sridevi's Tamil techie classmate in English class in English Vinglish (2013). Post this film, Ravindranathan went on to play roles in various films such as Shamitabh (2015) and Waiting (2015). He garnered appreciation by the audience for his role in Rocketry: The Nambi Effect (2022) as Param, Nambi Narayanan's friend. The character is fictitious and an amalgamation of  different people in Narayanan's life.

Ravindranathan is Bengaluru-based and has appeared in several plays.

Filmography

Plays 
Sources
Owl and the Pussy Cat
Zoo Story
Filth by Irvine Welsh
Gentleman
God of Carnage

References

External links

Actors in Hindi cinema
Actors in Tamil cinema
Year of birth missing (living people)
Living people
21st-century Indian male actors